The 2015 Uttlesford District Council election took place on 7 May 2015 to elect members of Uttlesford District Council in England. This was on the same day as other local elections.

Results summary

|- style="background:#f6f6f6;"
| colspan=2 style="text-align: right; margin-right: 1em" | Total
| style="text-align: right;" | 39
| colspan=5 |
| style="text-align: right;" | 76,206
| style="text-align: right;" |

Ward Results

Ashdon

Broad Oak and the Hallingburys

Clavering

Debden & Wimbish

Elsenham & Henham

Felsted & Stebbing

Flitch Green & Little Dunmow

Great Dunmow North

Great Dunmow South & Barnston

Hatfield Heath

High Easter & The Rodings

Littlebury, Chesterford & Wenden Lofts

Newport

Saffron Walden Audley

Saffron Walden Castle

Saffron Walden Shire

Stansted North

Stansted South & Birchanger

Stort Valley

Takeley

Thaxted & the Eastons

The Sampfords

References

2015 English local elections
May 2015 events in the United Kingdom
2015
2010s in Essex